Vincent E. R. Baker (died July 1990) was a South African professional golfer. He won the 1973 Benson & Hedges Festival of Golf on the European Tour.

Professional career
Baker played some tournaments in Britain in 1970. He qualified for the Open Championship through final qualifying at Carnoustie but missed the cut in the Championship itself at St Andrews. From its formation in 1972 until 1979, Baker was a regular competitor in European Tour events. He won once, in the 1973 Benson & Hedges Festival of Golf. Trailing by 5 shots after three rounds, Baker scored a final round 64 to win by 2 strokes from Dale Hayes. He was twice a runner-up, in the 1973 Scandinavian Enterprise Open and in the 1978 Italian Open. In addition to his 1970 appearance, Baker played in five further Open Championships between 1973 and 1978, making the cut twice. His best finish was in 1973 when he was tied for 37th place.

Baker won the ICL Transvaal Open in December 1974, beating Andries Oosthuizen in a sudden-death playoff. He was also runner-up in a number of important South African tournaments including the South African Open in early 1973, the South African PGA Championship in late 1973 and the South African Masters in 1975.

Murder 
In July 1990, Baker was stabbed to death in a carjacking by three teenagers near Durban.

Professional wins (2)

European Tour wins (1)

Sunshine Tour wins (1)
1974 ICL Transvaal Open

Results in major championships

Note: Baker only played in The Open Championship.

CUT = missed the half-way cut (3rd round cut in 1975 and 1978 Open Championships)

Team appearances
Double Diamond International (representing the Rest of the World): 1972

References

External links

South African male golfers
Sunshine Tour golfers
European Tour golfers
Year of birth missing
1990 deaths
Date of death missing